Kevin Jon Hodges (born June 24, 1973) is a former Major League Baseball and Nippon Professional Baseball right-handed pitcher.

He is the older brother of Trey Hodges, who also played in the major leagues and Nippon Professional Baseball.

Biography 
He was signed by the Yakult Swallows in mid-, and contributed to the team's league championship as part of the starting rotation.

In 2012, the Seibu Lions hired Kevin Hodges to scout the United States.

External links

1973 births
Living people
Seattle Mariners players
Yakult Swallows players
Baseball players from Texas
Major League Baseball pitchers
American expatriate baseball players in Japan
Tohoku Rakuten Golden Eagles players
KBO League pitchers
American expatriate baseball players in South Korea
Samsung Lions players
Lansing Lugnuts players
Jackson Generals (Texas League) players
New Orleans Zephyrs players
Tacoma Rainiers players
Bridgeport Bluefish players